Kis-My-Journey is the third studio album  by Japanese boy band Kis-My-Ft2. It was released July 7, 2014, under the record label Avex Trax. It was released in four different editions: 
First Edition A（AVCD-93000/B）
First Edition B（AVCD-93001/B）
Regular Edition（AVCD-93002）
Kis-My Shop Edition（AVC1-93003

The First Edition A packaging came in a pink pouch with Original Sticker Set A, while the First Edition B packaging came in a blue pouch with Original Sticker Set B. The First Edition A, First Edition B, and first press run of Regular Edition packages（AVCD-93002X）each came with a prize entry serial code. Each package comes with one of two deluxe 20-page photo booklet, with first editions A and B both including one and regular and Kis-My Shop editions having another.

Three days after release, Kis-My-Ft2 started on their first 4-dome tour titled 2014 Concert Tour Kis-My-Journey.

Commercial performance 
In the Oricon weekly album rankings for the week of July 7, 2014, it debuted at number 1. Sales during its first week totaled over 246,000 copies. It was the fourth consecutive album since their debut to reach number 1, a feat that had not been accomplished for the three years and one month since Superfly's fourth album.

Package contents 
First Edition A：CD+DVD
First Edition B：CD+DVD
Regular edition：CD
Kis-My Shop Edition：CD+Bonus item

CD 
 "3rd" Overture [1:25]
 Composition・Arrangement：Singo Kubota・Satoru Kurihara
 Seven Journey [4:35]
 Lyrics：KUREI、Composition：ISEKI、Arrangement：GIRA MUNDO
 3.6.5 [4:31]
 Lyrics：Kenn Kato、Composition：Yoshiyasu Ichigawa・Tatsuro Mashiko・ha-j、Arrangement：Taku Yoshioka
 DHC「Clinical Acne Control Series」advertisement song
 Striker [3:41]
 Lyrics・Rap lyrics：JUN、Composition・Arrangement：Tommy Clint
 Daisuki desu [5:10]
 Lyrics：Satoru Kurihara、Composition・Arrangement：Satoru Kurihara・Singo Kubota
 Ezaki Glico「Watering KissMint Gum」advertisement song
 FORM - Hiromitsu Kitayama [4:13]
 Lyrics・Composition：HusiQ.K、Arrangement：KASUMI・SOU
 LU4E〜Last Song〜 - Taisuke Fujigaya [5:07]
 Lyrics：Taisuke Fujigaya、Composition：mr.cho・Lawrence Lee・Kim Tesung、Arrangement：Masaya Suzuki
 Only One... - Yuta Tamamori [4:22]
 Lyrics：Yuta Tamamori・Kelly、Composition：DAICHI・Carlos Okabe、Arrangement：Jun Suyama
 FIRE!!! - Hiromitsu Kitayama、Taisuke Fujigaya [3:36]
 Lyrics：HusiQ.K・T.Fxxx、Composition：CHOKKAKU・SYB・IGGY、Arrangement：CHOKKAKU
 Tana kara Botamochi  - Busaiku [3:24]
 Lyrics・Composition・Arrangement：Masahiro Nakai・Kouji Miyashita・Masaya Miyashita
 Tsubasa [4:03]
 Lyrics・Composition：Yoshiyasu Ichigawa・Tatsuro Mashiko・ha-j、Arrangement：Yoshiyasu Ichigawa
 Hikari no Signal [4:26]
 Lyrics：Sensei、Composition：Atsuko Nakatani、Arrangement：Masaya Suzuki
 Theme song for the film 『Doraemon: New Nobita's Great Demon—Peko and the Exploration Party of Five』
 Bokura no Yakusoku [5:26]
 Lyrics：Hajime Watanabe、Composition：XYZ、Arrangement：Masafumi Nakao
 Ageteku ze! [3:41]
 Lyrics・Composition・Arrangement：Kazuaki Yamashita
 Regular edition bonus track

DVD 
First Edition A
 「Seven Journey」Music Video
 「Seven Journey」Making Of
Including member commentary
 Recording Studio Footage
Including member commentary
First Edition B
 「3.6.5」Music Video
 「3.6.5」Making Of
Including member commentary
 「Kis-My-TV」
A program talking about the album's theme of journeys
Including member commentary

Bonus items 
 Original file folder

References

External links 
 Kis-My-Journey - Johnny's Entertainment Official Listing

2014 albums
Avex Group albums